The Mysteries of Paris (French: Les mystères de Paris) may refer to:

 The Mysteries of Paris, a novel by the writer Eugène Sue
 The Mysteries of Paris (1922 film), a French silent film directed by Charles Burguet
 The Mysteries of Paris (1935 film), a French film directed by Félix Gandéra
 The Mysteries of Paris (1943 film), a French film directed by Jacques de Baroncelli
 The Mysteries of Paris (1957 film), a French-Italian film directed by Fernando Cerchio
 The Mysteries of Paris (1962 film), a French-Italian film directed by André Hunebelle